Steam Furnace is an unincorporated community in Adams County, in the U.S. state of Ohio.

History
The community was named for the steam-powered blast furnace once located there.

References

Unincorporated communities in Adams County, Ohio
Unincorporated communities in Ohio